The National Democratic Christian Party was a very small Romanian political party (i.e. a micro-party). It was not represented in the parliament. In the 2008 elections, it won only 316 votes (below 0.01%) for the Chamber of Deputies and 1,365 votes (0.02%) for the Senate. Mainly a local party working in Prahova County and in the county capital Ploiești, the NDCP had 5 representatives in the county council and also 2 in the city council of Ploiești. The party subsequently dissolved in 2014.

Electoral history

Legislative elections

References

Defunct political parties in Romania
Christian democratic parties in Europe
Political parties established in 1990
Conservative parties in Romania
Political parties disestablished in 2014